Sára Jahodová (born 15 October 1984) is a Czech and later British female curler and curling coach.

Teams

Women's

Mixed

Record as a coach of national teams

References

External links

Czech national women team (2008) - Czech Curling Federation (web archive)
Jahodová Sára - Player statistics (all games with his/her participation) - Czech Curling Association

Living people
1984 births

Czech female curlers
English female curlers
English curling champions
Czech curling coaches
English curling coaches
Place of birth missing (living people)
Czech emigrants to England